Tatyana Stanislavovna Kurnikova (born 1965) is a Soviet swimmer who won two medals at the 1985 European Aquatics Championships. She missed the 1984 Summer Olympics due to their boycott by the Soviet Unions and competed at the Friendship Games instead, winning four medals. She won another four medals, two gold and two silver, at the Universiades in 1983 and 1985. 

Currently she works as a swimming coach at a sports school in Moscow. and occasionally competes in the masters category.

References

External links
Profile at Infosport.ru 

1965 births
Living people
Sportspeople from Baku
Soviet female swimmers
European Aquatics Championships medalists in swimming
Universiade medalists in swimming
Universiade gold medalists for the Soviet Union
Universiade silver medalists for the Soviet Union